Sol del Paraguay Lineas Aereas S.A. is a Paraguayan passenger airline, based at Silvio Pettirossi International Airport in the city of Asuncion.

History
The project to create the airline began on July 1, 2010. Sol del Paraguay is also a Paraguayan road transportation company that runs national and international routes, and is one of the largest long-distance bus operators in Paraguay. Due to its rapid growth, the company decided to expand and thus the idea to launch Sol del Paraguay Lineas Aereas came about. It had 3 Fokker 100s with a capacity of 108 passengers, with another on order. The company's first proving flight took place in May 2011, coinciding with the 200th anniversary of Paraguayan independence, and scheduled services began on July 15, 2011. The airline operated two routes, with twice-daily domestic flights between Asunción and Ciudad del Este; and twice-daily between Asunción and Buenos Aires.

The launch of Sol del Paraguay Lineas Aereas was considered very important in Paraguay. The country had spent 15 years without a national airline, since former flag-carrier, Líneas Aéreas Paraguayas became a part of Brazilian airline TAM in 1996. The initiation of flights in 2011 was somewhat symbolic, as it was the bicentenary of Paraguayan independence, and the company's three aircraft were all named after Paraguayan national symbols: Lago de Ypacaraí, Itapúa Poty, and Héroes del Chaco. It had been reported that Sol del Paraguay would operate domestic flights to Encarnacion and Pedro Juan Caballero, two cities which, despite having airports, did not have any scheduled flights.

On August 1, 2012, the airline ceased all operations due to financial problems following a local economic downturn.

In mid-2014 a proposal came out to revive the company, now only the Paraguayan aeronautical authorities are expected to restart flights. Since the restart of its operations on January 12, 2016, it operates in said aircraft to Encarnacion, then Pedro Juan Caballero was added among its destinations, and as of July 2019, Ciudad del Este was also added.

Destinations
The company operates to the following destinations as of 2021:

Fleet

Current fleet

The airline operates the following fleet:

Former fleet
When Sol del Paraguay ceased operations in August 2012, it operated the following aircraft:

See also
List of airlines of Paraguay

References

External links
Sol del Paraguay

Defunct airlines of Paraguay
Airlines established in 2010